Rai Südtirol is a German-language radio and television service provided by the Italian public-service broadcaster RAI to South Tyrol from its studios in Bozen.

Services 
 Rai Südtirol (TV channel)
 Rai Südtirol (radio)

External links
 Official Website

1966 establishments in Italy
German-language mass media in South Tyrol
Südtirol
Mass media in Bolzano
Television channels and stations established in 1966